Katharina Molitor (born 8 November 1983) is a German sportswoman who competes as a javelin thrower and volleyball player. As a javelin thrower, she is a World Champion, having won gold in 2015, and her personal best throw is 67.69 m. As a volleyball player, she represents Bayer Leverkusen in the Erste Volleyball-Bundesliga, the highest tier of German volleyball.

She is a two-time Olympian, having competed in the javelin throw for Germany at the 2008 and 2012 Summer Olympics. She finished eighth in 2008, and improved to sixth in 2012. She won gold at the 2010 German Championships and has since competed in every European and World Championships. Her best result is first place at the 2015 World Championships.

Competition record

References

External links
 
 
 
 
 
 Katharina Molitor at Deutscher Leichtathletik-Verband 
 
  

1983 births
Living people
People from Rhein-Erft-Kreis
Sportspeople from Cologne (region)
German female javelin throwers
German women's volleyball players
German national athletics champions
Athletes (track and field) at the 2008 Summer Olympics
Athletes (track and field) at the 2012 Summer Olympics
Olympic athletes of Germany
World Athletics Championships athletes for Germany
World Athletics Championships medalists
World Athletics Championships winners
20th-century German women
21st-century German women